WWF The Music, Volume 4 is a soundtrack album by WWE (then known as the World Wrestling Federation, or WWF). Released on November 2, 1999 by Koch Records, it features entrance theme music of various WWE superstars, all of which were composed and performed by Jim Johnston (with the exception of one song, performed by H-Blockx). The album was a commercial success, charting at number four in the U.S.

Composition
All songs on WWF The Music, Volume 4 were written, composed and performed by WWE composer Jim Johnston, with the exception of "Oh Hell Yeah" which was performed by German heavy metal band H-Blockx. Music website AllMusic categorised the album as heavy metal and post-grunge, while a review on Slam! Wrestling identified additional genres including honky-tonk and hip hop on certain tracks.

Reception

Commercial
WWF The Music, Volume 4 was a commercial success. In the US, the album reached number four on the US Billboard 200 and number 17 on the Top Internet Albums chart; in Canada, it reached number five on the Canadian Albums Chart. It was certified platinum by the Recording Industry Association of America, indicating sales of over a million units. The album also reached number 44 on the UK Albums Chart. WWF The Music, Volume 4 was the second WWE album to sell a million copies, and as of April 2002 had sold a total of 1.13 million copies.

Critical
Music website AllMusic awarded the album two out of five stars. Writer Stephen Thomas Erlewine noted that it "certainly has an audience," but that anyone other than "wrestling nuts ... pretty much knows not to bother in the first place." Alex Ristic of Slam! Wrestling was similarly sceptical, noting that while the album "represents the individual mat stars to a tee," that is "not necessarily a good thing." Ristic criticised tracks such as "Big" and "Sexual Chocolate", although did praise songs including "Break Down the Wall" and "Danger at the Door" and concluded that "the majority of [the material] is quite good."

Track listing

Charts

Weekly charts

Year-end charts

Certifications

See also

Music in professional wrestling

References

The Music, Volume 4
WWF The Music, Volume 4
WWF The Music, Volume 4
WWF The Music, Volume 4